"Only Sixteen" is a song by American singer-songwriter Sam Cooke, released in May 1959. The song was a top 15 hit on Billboard's Hot R&B Sides chart and also charted within the top 30 of the Billboard Hot 100 and the UK Singles Chart. In the UK it was covered, and taken to No. 1, by Craig Douglas.

Background
"Only Sixteen" was inspired by the sixteenth birthday of Lou Rawls's stepsister, Eunice. The song was originally intended for actor Steve Rowland, who often hung around the Keen studio. Rowland asked Cooke to write a song for him, and Cooke borrowed the bridge from an earlier song of his, "Little Things You Do". Rowland's manager disliked the song, and Cooke re-recorded it for himself.

Personnel
Credits adapted from the liner notes to the 2003 compilation Portrait of a Legend: 1951–1964.
Sam Cooke – vocals
Clifton White – guitar
René Hall – guitar
Adolphus Asbrook – bass guitar
Charles Blackwell – drums

Chart performance

The Supremes version

The Supremes recorded a version, first released on their tribute album We Remember Sam Cooke (1965). In 1968, it was released as an A-side single in Scandinavia,  as Diana Ross & the Supremes, where it reached number three in Sweden. The B-side, "Some Things You Never Get Used To" was released elsewhere as an A-side, becoming a top 40 hit in the US, Canada, and the UK.

Charts

Dr. Hook version

Dr. Hook released a version of "Only Sixteen" in the winter of 1975. Their version was the most successful chart release of the song. It reached number six on the US Billboard Hot 100 and number five on Cash Box. Dr. Hook's version spent 22 weeks on the charts and became a Gold record. The song was banned by the BBC.

Chart performance

Weekly charts

Year-end charts

Certifications

Other cover versions
Terry Black released a version of the song in Canada in 1965 where it reached number 14. 
The Supremes recorded it on their 1965 album We Remember Sam Cooke.
Jamaican artist Cornell Campbell also recorded a reggae version of the song.

Samples
E-40 and The Click sampled it on their first record, singing the hook in the intro.

See also
List of UK Singles Chart number ones of the 1950s

References

Songs about teenagers
1959 songs
1959 singles
1965 singles
1975 singles
1976 singles
Songs written by Sam Cooke
Sam Cooke songs
Terry Black songs
The Supremes songs
UK Singles Chart number-one singles
Keen Records singles
Dr. Hook & the Medicine Show songs
Song recordings produced by Ron Haffkine
Capitol Records singles
Songs banned by the BBC